Sayakhat Airlines or Sayakhat Air Company was an airline based in Almaty, Kazakhstan. It operated chartered cargo and passenger flights out of Almaty International Airport.

History 
The airline was founded in 1989 by Vladimir Kouropatenko and Nikolai Alexeyevich Kuznetsov as the first private airline company in Kazakhstan. Flight operations started in 1991.

Fleet
The Sayakhat Airlines fleet included the following aircraft:

4 Ilyushin Il-76TD
3 Tupolev Tu-154M

References

External links

Defunct airlines of Kazakhstan
Airlines established in 1989
Airlines disestablished in 2012